Carl William Hergenrother (born 1973) is an American astronomer and discoverer of minor planets and comets.

As credited by the Minor Planet Center, he has discovered and co-discovered 32 numbered asteroids at the Bigelow Sky Survey during 1993–1999. He has also discovered a number of comets including the long-period comet, C/1996 R1 (Hergenrother-Spahr), and three periodic comets, 168P/Hergenrother, 175P/Hergenrother and P/1999 V1 (Catalina). He is also a member of the science and operations team of the 2016-launched OSIRIS-REx spacecraft, a sample return mission to study near-Earth asteroid 101955 Bennu.

The outer main-belt asteroid 3099 Hergenrother was named in his honor on 3 May 1996.

List of discovered minor planets

See also

References

External links 
 Beyond Pluto: exploring the outer limits of the solar system, John Keith Davies, Cambridge University Press
 Get to Know a Staff Scientist: Carl Hergenrother, Lunar & Planetary Laboratory, University of Arizona

1973 births
American astronomers
Discoverers of asteroids
Discoverers of comets

Living people
Planetary scientists